Theresa Tova (born 1955) is a Canadian actress, singer and playwright. She is most noted for her play Still the Night, which won several Dora Mavor Moore Awards in 1997 and was a shortlisted finalist for the Governor General's Award for English-language drama at the 1999 Governor General's Awards.

The daughter of Polish Jewish survivors of the Holocaust, Tova was born in Paris, France and raised in Calgary, Alberta. Primarily a stage and musical theatre actress, she also had a role in the television series E.N.G. in the early 1990s as Marge Atherton, for which she received a Gemini Award nomination for Best Performance by an Actress in a Supporting Role at the 8th Gemini Awards in 1993.

Still the Night, a musical play which combined Jewish music, including vaudeville and klezmer, with the story of two young girls surviving the Holocaust in the forests of Poland, was staged in 1996 by Theatre Passe Muraille. It won four Dora Awards in the Mid-Sized Theatre division in 1997, for outstanding new play or musical, outstanding production, outstanding music (John Alcorn) and outstanding female performance in a musical (Liza Balkan).

Tova has continued to act on stage, including productions of They're Playing Our Song, Fiddler on the Roof and The Diary of Anne Frank, as well as in supporting television, film and web series roles. In 2017, she was elected president of the Toronto chapter of ACTRA.

She was a Canadian Screen Award nominee for Best Lead Performance in a Web Program or Series at the 10th Canadian Screen Awards in 2022 for the web series For the Record.

References

External links

1955 births
Living people
20th-century Canadian actresses
20th-century Canadian dramatists and playwrights
20th-century Canadian women writers
20th-century Canadian women singers
21st-century Canadian actresses
21st-century Canadian dramatists and playwrights
21st-century Canadian women writers
21st-century Canadian women singers
Canadian film actresses
Canadian musical theatre actresses
Canadian people of Polish-Jewish descent
Canadian stage actresses
Canadian television actresses
Canadian women dramatists and playwrights
Dora Mavor Moore Award winners
Jewish Canadian actresses
Jewish Canadian writers
Actresses from Calgary
Musicians from Calgary
Writers from Calgary